The 2022–23 Elche CF season is the club's 100th season in existence and the third consecutive season in the top flight of Spanish football. In addition to the domestic league, Elche participated in this season's edition of the Copa del Rey. The season covers the period from 1 July 2022 to 30 June 2023.

Players

First-team squad 
.

Out on loan

Transfers

In

Out

Pre-season and friendlies

Competitions

Overall record

La Liga

League table

Results summary

Results by round

Matches 
The league fixtures were announced on 23 June 2022.

Copa del Rey

Notes

References

Elche CF seasons
Elche